North East Lincolnshire Council is the local authority of North East Lincolnshire. It is a unitary authority, having the powers of a non-metropolitan county and district council combined. It was established following the abolition of Humberside County Council on 1 April 1996. The council provides a full range of local government services including Council Tax billing, libraries, social services, processing planning applications, waste collection and disposal, and it is a local education authority.

Powers and functions 
The local authority derives its powers and functions from the Local Government Act 1972 and subsequent legislation. For the purposes of local government, North East Lincolnshire is within a non-metropolitan area of England. As a unitary authority, North East Lincolnshire Council has the powers and functions of both a non-metropolitan county and district council combined. In its capacity as a district council it is a billing authority collecting Council Tax and business rates, it processes local planning applications, it is responsible for housing, waste collection and environmental health. In its capacity as a county council it is a local education authority, responsible for social services, libraries and waste disposal.

In July 2017 it was announced that the Council and the local Clinical Commissioning Group would have a joint chief executive.

Political Make-up 

The present political make-up of the council is: Conservative (32), Labour (7) and Liberal Democrats (3)

Wards and councillors 

 A  Walker was previously a councillor for Scartho from 1995 to 1999, before losing his seat to the Conservatives. He left Labour in February 2019, joining the Liberal Democrats and was re-elected for that party in May 2019.
 B  Barber was first elected as a Liberal Democrat councillor, but defected to Labour shortly before he was due to stand for re-election in 2012.
 C  James was first elected as a Liberal Democrat councillor, but defected to Labour shortly after Labour defeated a Lib Dem councillor in the same ward at the 2011 local elections.
 D  Lindley was previously a Labour councillor for West Marsh from 2010 to 2014. 
 E  Shepherd was first elected as UKIP, but defected to the Conservatives shortly before he was due to stand for re-election in 2016.
 F  Mickleburgh was previously a councillor for West Marsh from 2014 to 2018, before changing wards.
 G  Wilson was previously a councillor for Heneage from 2010 to 2014, before losing his seat to UKIP.
 H  Cairns was first elected as UKIP in 2014, but defected to the Conservatives several months before he was due to stand for re-election in 2018.
 I  Bramley was first elected as Labour in 2010, but defected to UKIP in 2013 and defended her seat for them in 2014. She lost her seat to Labour in 2018, coming third, but regained it in 2019.
 J  Hyldon-King was previously a councillor for Freshney from 1995 to 2003, before losing her seat to the Conservatives, and then again from 2004 to 2008, before losing again but to the Liberal Democrats.
 L  Wheatley was previously a councillor in East Marsh from 1999 to 2003, before losing her seat to the Liberal Democrats.
 M  Harness was first elected as UKIP councillor, but quit the party in 2015, later joining the Conservatives in 2016 and thus seeking re-election for them in 2018. 
 N  Stewart Swinburn was previously a councillor for Immingham from 2003 to 2011, before losing his seat to Labour.
 O  Karen Swinburn was previously a councillor for Immingham from 2006 to 2010, before losing her seat to Labour.
 P  Pettigrew was first elected as a UKIP councillor for Freshney in 2014, but defected to the Conservatives in early 2017. He sought re-election to the authority in Waltham, a much safer Conservative seat, as he likely assumed Labour might have defeated him if he sought re-election in Freshney as they had won it in every election since he won at that point. Ironically, however, the Conservatives did win there with a new candidate.
 Q  Hudson was previously a UKIP councillor for Scartho from 2014 to 2018, at which point he stood down before rejoining the Conservative Party, having previously been a candidate for them in 2008.

North East Lincolnshire Regeneration Partnership 
In 2010 North East Lincolnshire Council entered into a partnership with Balfour Beatty Workplace Limited, which was taken over by Cofely GDF SUEZ in 2013 (renamed Engie 2016) on a 10-year partnership to deliver facilities management.

School WWI roll of honour in storage
There was a roll of honour at Matthew Humberston Foundation School commemorating the deaths of 42 past pupils of the school who died in World War I, but after the closure of the school in 2010, it was put into storage at the Council offices.  the roll of honour was still being stored by the Council, "with a view to being put on public display in a new town centre museum and heritage centre".

References

External links 
North East Lincolnshire – Official website

Unitary authority councils of England
Local education authorities in England
Local authorities in Lincolnshire
Leader and cabinet executives
Billing authorities in England
Borough of North East Lincolnshire